1969–70 was the 23rd season of the Western International Hockey League.

The Western International Hockey League played an interleague schedule with the Alberta Senior Hockey League.

Standings
 Spokane Jets		        50		33	14	 3				219	123		 69
 Nelson Maple Leafs		50		27	21 	 2				241	209		 56
 Kimberley Dynamiters	        46		19	26	 1				167	190		 39
 Cranbrook Royals		50		19	30	 1				208	254		 39
 Trail Smoke Eaters		50		12	37	 1				174	293		 25

Playoffs

Semi finals (best of 7)
 Spokane defeated Cranbrook 4 games to 1
 Nelson defeated Kimberley 4 games to 3

Final (best of 7)
 Spokane defeated Nelson 4 games to 0

The Spokane Jets advanced to the 1969-70 Western Canada Allan Cup Playoffs.

References 

Western International Hockey League seasons
Wihl
Wihl